The Grozny truck bombing occurred on December 27, 2002, when three Chechen suicide bombers ran vehicles into the heavily guarded republic's government headquarters in the regional capital Grozny.

Details 
The drivers of two vehicles reportedly wore federal military uniforms and carried official passes which allowed them through three successive military checkpoints on their way to the headquarters building. A guard at the fourth and final checkpoint attempted to inspect the vehicles, and began firing on the vehicles as they drove through the checkpoint towards the building.

The explosion by the equivalent of a ton of dynamite brought down the roof and floors of the four-story building. The first reports said of as few as two dead. Ultimately, Chechen officials said 83 people were killed (48 on the spot) and 210 were injured. Several Chechen administration officials were injured in the attack, including Deputy Prime Minister Zina Batyzheva (seriously wounded) and Chechen Security Council Secretary Rudnik Dudayev. The head of the pro-Russian administration in Chechnya, Akhmad Kadyrov, and his Prime Minister, Mikhail Babich, were not in the building at the time.

Responsibility 

Colonel Ilya Shabalkin, spokesman for the joint federal forces in Chechnya, said the bombing was organized by Chechen rebel field commanders Abu al-Walid and Shamil Basayev. Basayev claimed responsibility for the planning and execution of the attack, saying that he personally detonated the bomb by remote control.

Some news reports called the attack an act of terrorism, which with 83 confirmed fatalities, would have been the deadliest terrorist attack in Chechnya. Others described the attackers as militants and rebels and not terrorists.

References

External links
Chechen rebels punch ever harder, BBC News, 27 December 2002
Chechnya suicide bombers 'used Russian military links', The Guardian, December 29, 2002

Suicide bombings in 2002
21st-century mass murder in Russia
2002 in Russia
Mass murder in 2002
Islamic terrorism in Russia
History of Grozny
Suicide car and truck bombings in Europe
Suicide bombing in the Chechen wars
Terrorist incidents in Russia in 2002
Car and truck bombings in the Chechen wars
Islamic terrorist incidents in 2002
December 2002 events in Russia
2002 in Chechnya